Semaphore South  is a beachside suburb of Adelaide, in the City of Port Adelaide Enfield.

The Semaphore South Post Office opened on 3 November 1947 and closed in 1978.

Politics

Semaphore South is located in the state electoral district of Lee and the federal division of Hindmarsh.

References

Suburbs of Adelaide
Lefevre Peninsula